The History of Olympic National Sports Complex in Kyiv, Ukraine stretches back to the start of the 20th century. Located at the foot of city's central Cherepanova Hill in Pechersk Raion it was built following the Russian Civil War in 1923 after Kyiv was finally secured by the Red Army.

Red Stadium
The predecessor of the contemporary National Arena was the Kyiv City Stadium, which with the establishment of Soviet power was eventually renamed and better known as the Red Stadium. The construction of that stadium in Kyiv was considered as early as 1914, when the city was the commercial and cultural center of the Russian Empire's Southwest, and the Empire's third most important city (in some perspectives). The plans were shelved during World War I. In the following years, the city was in turmoil as the wars, revolutions, forces of different states and stateless bands occupied and fought in the city. The Bolshevik government revived the idea as the proposed Red Stadium in 1919, but the resumption of hostilities ended the project prematurely.

Chaos gave way to stability in the early 1920s, with the capital of the Soviet Ukraine re-established in Kharkov (1919) and Kyiv having the status of guberniya center. Construction resumed under the leadership of engineer L. I. Pilvinsky in early 1923, to host the Second All-Ukrainian Spartakiad to be held in August of that year. The chosen site was the former location of the 1913 All-Russian exhibition—the war-ravaged lot of the Oleksiivsky Park. The southern and eastern stands used the slopes of Cherepanov Mount, while the northern and western stands were constructed from the parts of damaged and adjacently located buildings. The football field size was 120x70, orienting west to east. The military commissar of the Kyiv Governorate Laiozs Gavro sponsored the construction project. The games were opened at the Trotsky Red Stadium on August 12, 1923 (by 1924 the name of Trotsky was omitted). The stadium became the main sports arena in the region and the home ground of FC Lokomotyv Kyiv (Zheldor Kiev).

Republican level of renovation 

Many mistakes were made due to the rushed construction. In particular, the stadium was aligned along an east-west axis instead of the standard north-south. So in 1934 as the Republican administration was moved to Kyiv (from Kharkiv), the plans were made for the replacement of the stadium, and in 1936 construction began on the new 50,000-seat stadium designed by architect Mykhailo Hrechyna (1902–1979) called the Ukrainian Republican Stadium. Later Hrechyna organized all the renovations of the stadium until the 1980s. Among other Hrechyna's notable projects were Palace of Sports (located in the vicinity), Komsomolsky residential massif at the Dnipro Raion, Hotel "Rus", a building of the Trade-Industrial Chamber, as well as the hotel "Tarasova Hora" in Kaniv.

The construction started on grounds adjacent to the Red Stadium. By Hrechyna's design the stadium was to be one of the best after the Moscow and Leningrad stadiums. The entrance to the stadium was beautified by the Corinthian Order colonnade of 22 columns. However, due to the lack of funding the construction of the colonnade was suspended and never finished. The complex was scheduled for completion in 1941 (see Five-Year Plan) and the ceremonial opening was scheduled for June 22, 1941. It was decided to name the stadium in honor of the first secretary of the Communist Party of Ukraine, Nikita Khrushchev. A game fixture of the Soviet Top League was scheduled on the opening day between Dynamo Kyiv and Red Army team.

However, in a monumental twist of history, on that very day Kyiv was bombed by the Luftwaffe as part of the Axis invasion of the Soviet Union, the onset of the Great Patriotic War. The opening ceremony was not canceled, however: a sign hung on the stadium gates optimistically indicated that it was merely "postponed until after the victory". Indeed, following the 1945 Soviet Victory over Nazi Germany, not only was the stadium reconstructed, but tickets issued in 1941 were honored for admittance to an opening ceremony of the Respublikanskiy (Republican) Stadium in 1944.

World War II

During the war all events at the stadium were suspended as the front line moved across and away from the city. With the military actions moving farther east, life in Kyiv was more or less stabilized. During that time the stadium was unofficially called the Sport Palace Stadium. On July 12, 1942 the stadium was officially reopened as the All-Ukrainian Stadium.

After the liberation of Kyiv on November 6, 1943 retreating German troops damaged the stadium and some of its features were removed.  It needed a major renovation which was undertaken by Khrestchatykbud (later - Kievcitybud-4). With the help of Kyiv residents the stadium conditions were returned to order in half a year.

After the war 

The stadium was re-opened on June 25, 1944. Symbolically, the first game was between Dynamo Kyiv and CDKA Moscow, the same one that was to have taken place three years before. The Kyivan club was defeated 0:4, however it did not kill the celebratory mood of the event. Here is how the local newspapers were describing it:

The government of the republic and Khrushchev personally requested the architects and builders to bring the stadium to its prewar condition as well as provide it with the latest improvements. Firstly, they were to install what was previously intended but not completed, such as the VIP stand, the sports pavilion with a colonnade, fence, etc. Secondly, floodlights to conduct football games in the evening hours as well as a contemporary scoreboard were to be installed. However, the scoreboard was not installed until 1949 and the match results were displayed on plates that were hung on poles with ladders and were changed by the stadium servicemen as the game went on. Improvements to the stadium were slowing down due to lack of investment and reconstruction stretched for five years until 1949.

In the early 1950s a wooden scoreboard finally appeared over the stands of the southern goalpost. The names of teams and the score were depicted in meter-size letters on a 6x3 meters plywood shield, in a metal frame. After every scored goal a stadium serviceman would climb to the top by a special ladder and change the plates on the scoreboard. In the summer of 1954 the construction of the stadium main facade, the colonnade with a service entrance to the inside court of an administrative building, was finalized. Those columns became the distinguished landmark of the stadium.

Further improvements

The main achievement of that time was the installation in 1956 of four 45-meter metal towers with 320 spotlights having a total brightness of 500 lux. Also in 1956 a more contemporary scoreboard was installed. It had a clock in the middle and was equipped with electric lamps that displayed match results electronically. In October 1962 the stadium changed its name to the Central Stadium. It was at that time that the old scoreboard was replaced with a new electronic one which was bought in Hungary. On April 10, 1963 at the game Dynamo Kyiv - Spartak Moscow, spectators could for the first time see the scoreboard display the score and specifying the time when the goals were scored and the names of their authors.

As the city boomed in the postwar years and its population approached two million, the stadium underwent its second major reconstruction in the mid-1960s. The renovations were planned to be completed prior to the 50th anniversary of the October Revolution (1967). In 1966–68 the Kyiv Central Stadium was enlarged to accommodate some 100,000 spectators with the addition of a second tier of seating. The design of the reconstruction was by the architects of Kyivan zonal scientific-research institute of typical and experimental planning and Kievproject headed by Mykhailo Hrechyna. The mounting of the second tier on the original double-console crossbars of reinforced concrete was considered to be the avant-garde practice in stadium construction across the globe. The expanded complex also included indoor tennis courts, two additional football pitches, several outdoor courts and other arenas, and notably a ski jumping ramp of a rather novel suspended design. During that reconstruction the scoreboard was replaced by two new ones measuring 18x6 meters. One displayed the time, date, and temperature, and the other the names of the teams, the game score and names of the goalscorers. Also, a news reporting complex was built. Over the upper tier of the western stand on tall supports several cabins were mounted for commentators.

Olympic preparations
The new stadium served the city until 1978, when it underwent a new cycle of complete reconstruction to accommodate the 1980 Summer Olympics which were hosted by the Soviet Union. The reconstruction project was developed back in 1977 and was closed down a year thereafter in summer of 1978. The last match Dynamo played at the stadium before its closure for renovation against Pakhtakor on 1 July 1978. Until the end of 1978 Dynamo was forced to play its home games at SKA Stadium in Kyiv, Druzhba in Lviv, and Metalist in Kharkiv. In 1979 Dynamo was hosting its home games at its own Dynamo Stadium, while the Olympic year Dynamo spent at its stadium and Avanhard in Uzhhorod. In Uzhhorod Dynamo hosted at least two league matches against CSKA Moscow and Zenit Leningrad as well as all of its seven matches as part of the 1980 Soviet Cup.

Earlier in 1980 the stadium was renamed, yet again, as the Republican Stadium, a name that would remain for several years after the collapse of the Soviet Union. Renovations were expected to be completed by end of June and on June 30 there was scheduled to take place grand opening that was timed with the game that took place two years prior before the stadium's closure between Dynamo and Pakhtakor.  However as it often took place in the Soviet times, at the final stage of construction something got stalled and the day of opening had to be postponed. The match between main teams of Ukraine and Uzbekistan took place in neighboring Dynamo Stadium at the same time it was originally scheduled to take place at Respublikansky Stadium.

While it is believed that the opening match of the stadium is the game between East Germany and Spain, in reality it is inaccurate as before the Olympic football tournament final stage the stadium was tested out in the Soviet Second League match between Ukrainian teams of SKA Kyiv and Okean Kerch. One of the players who took part in the match was Ihor Nakonechnyi as a half-back of SKA Kyiv. He mentioned that grass at the match was too high and it was complicated to play.

The Republican Stadium hosted the local ceremony of the Grand Opening of the 1980 Olympics followed by several football matches (the final games were held in the official host city, Moscow).

Dynamo finally returned to the arena soon after the Summer Olympics.

The nearby Kyiv Metro station Respublikanskiy Stadion was opened in late 1984.

Major football events

1970 FIFA World Cup qualification
Group 4 (Europe)

1975 European Super Cup
Final

Football at the 1980 Summer Olympics
Group C

Group D

Quarter final

1990 FIFA World Cup qualification
Group 3 (Europe)

Recent developments
After Ukrainian independence in 1991, the stadium was given national status in 1996 and renamed the "Olympic" National Sports Complex. Kyivans still commonly refer to it as the Tsentralny (Central) or Respublykanskyi stadion (Republican Stadium), and the nearby metro station was also called Respublykanskyi Stadion until 2010 when it was renamed Olympiyska

In 1997–99 the stadium was reconstructed in accordance with FIFA guidelines, and its capacity was reduced to 83,450. The stadium continued to be the home ground of Dynamo with the Lobanovsky stadium serving as a training ground. Some time after 1998 big changes took place as the stadium was not being efficiently maintained. Dynamo decided to reconstruct Lobanovsky Dynamo Stadium to become its primary ground due to the fact that attendance rarely exceeded 10,000 spectators. Since that time Olympic is used primarily for football international matches and is being lent to FC Dynamo Kyiv for high-profile home games when a high turnout is expected. However, it is not the official home ground of Dynamo or any other Kyiv club, as they all have smaller home stadiums and training bases. The stadium is an official home ground of the Ukraine national football team and was the official venue of the Ukrainian Cup final until 2008. Since 2008, Olympic is under major reconstruction in preparation for the continental championship.

Euro 2012 

On 18 April 2007, Poland and Ukraine were chosen to co-host Euro 2012, the finals of the 2012 UEFA European Football Championship, with the Olympic set to host the final. The reconstruction of the stadium involved the demolition and rebuilding of the lower tier, a completely new west stand with a two-level press box (or luxury boxes) between the two tiers, the addition of a 13-story high rise building to the west, and the addition of a new roof covering the entire seating area. The capacity of the stadium after this reconstruction would be 69,004.

On 1 December 2008, reconstruction began when a winner of countless tenders held was announced. The stadium was reopened on 9 October 2011 with a performance by Shakira and had its international football inauguration with a friendly game between Ukraine and Germany on 11 November 2011. It hosted the final of Euro 2012.

Web cameras 

Top view
Side view

References

External links
 Journal of reconstruction «Olympic» NSC 

Olimpiysky History
History of Kyiv